Fishia yosemitae, the dark grey fishia or grey fishia, is a moth in the family Noctuidae. It is found from central Alberta to Colorado in the Rocky Mountain and Great Plains regions. It is also found in eastern, central, and southern California, as well as in the Intermountain region. The habitat consists of dry open areas, including open ponderosa pine forests, juniper woodlands and sagebrush steppe at low to middle elevations.

The length of the forewings is 15–19 mm. Adults have a streaky gray forewing with black basal and median dashes and sawtooth lines. The hindwing fringe is white with a darker base in both sexes. Adults are on wing in fall.

The larvae feed on various herbaceous plants, including plants in the families Asteraceae and Scrophulariaceae, as well as Eriogonum species.

References

Moths described in 1873
Apameini
Moths of North America